The Dark Room (1995) is a crime novel by English writer Minette Walters. It was shortlisted for a CWA Gold Dagger.

Television adaptation
It was adapted for television in 1999 by the BBC. The cast featured Dervla Kirwan as Jane 'Jinx' Kingsley and James Wilby as Dr. Protheroe.

External links 
More about The Dark Room on Walters' website
Agent's dedicated page

1995 British novels
Novels by Minette Walters
British novels adapted into films
Macmillan Publishers books